{{DISPLAYTITLE:C24H18O12}}
The molecular formula C24H18O12 (molar mass: 498.39 g/mol, exact mass: 498.07982598 u) may refer to :
 Tetrafucol A, a fucol-type phlorotannin
 Tetraphlorethol C, a phlorethol-type phlorotannin

Molecular formulas